Azzahra Permatahani (born 2002) is an Indonesian swimmer.

In 2017, she won the silver medal in the women's 400 metre individual medley at the 2017 Islamic Solidarity Games held in Baku, Azerbaijan. In the same year, she competed in the women's 400 metre individual medley event at the 2017 World Aquatics Championships held in Budapest, Hungary. In this event she did not advance to compete in the final. The following year, she represented Indonesia at the 2018 Asian Games held in Jakarta, Indonesia. In 2018, she also competed at the Summer Youth Olympics held in Buenos Aires, Argentina.

In 2019, she represented Indonesia at the World Aquatics Championships held in Gwangju, South Korea. She competed in the women's 400 metre individual medley event and she did not advance to compete in the final.

In 2021, she competed in the 2020 Summer Olympics competing in Women's 400 metre individual medley.

She won multiple medals at the 2022 ASEAN University Games held in Ubon Ratchathani, Thailand.

References 

Living people
2002 births
Place of birth missing (living people)
Indonesian female swimmers
Asian Games competitors for Indonesia
Swimmers at the 2018 Asian Games
Competitors at the 2017 Southeast Asian Games
Competitors at the 2019 Southeast Asian Games
Swimmers at the 2018 Summer Youth Olympics
Female medley swimmers
Southeast Asian Games medalists in swimming
Southeast Asian Games silver medalists for Indonesia
Southeast Asian Games bronze medalists for Indonesia
Swimmers at the 2020 Summer Olympics
Olympic swimmers of Indonesia
Competitors at the 2021 Southeast Asian Games
21st-century Indonesian women